The Women's 1 metre springboard competition at the 2019 World Aquatics Championships was held on 12 and 13 July 2019.

Results
The preliminary round was started on 12 July at 15:30. The final was started on 13 July at 15:30.

Green denotes finalists

References

Women's 1 metre springboard